Ole Jacob Malm (21 December 1910 – 31 May 2005) was a Norwegian physician. He was born in Kristiania, and was a grandson of Ole Olsen Malm. He was professor of medicine at the University of Oslo and senior consultant at Ullevål Hospital in Oslo from 1964 to 1980. During the Occupation of Norway by Nazi Germany he assumed central positions in the resistance movement, including a period as Secretary General of the Coordination Committee. He was decorated Knight, First Class of the Order of St. Olav in 1976.

References

External links

1910 births
2005 deaths
Norwegian resistance members
Oslo University Hospital people
20th-century Norwegian physicians